Essington is a civil parish in the district of South Staffordshire, Staffordshire, England. It contains four listed buildings that are recorded in the National Heritage List for England.  All the listed buildings are designated at Grade II, the lowest of the three grades, which is applied to "buildings of national importance and special interest".  The parish includes the village of Essington and the surrounding area.  There are no listed buildings in the village, all the listed buildings being farmhouses in the surrounding area.


Buildings

References

Citations

Sources

Lists of listed buildings in Staffordshire